Dendyae is a genus of calcareous sponges in the family Dendyidae.

Species
Dendya amitsbo Hozawa, 1929
Dendya cavata (Carter, 1886)
Dendya clathrata (Carter, 1883)
Dendya quadripodifera Hozawa, 1929
Dendya tripodifera (Carter, 1886)
Dendya triradiata Tanita, 1943

References

Clathrinida